Ages and Ages is an American rock band from Portland, Oregon. Every member of the band sings accompanied by handclaps, shakers and noise-makers.

The group was voted as a top Portland band by Willamette Week. In 2011, they signed a record deal with Partisan Records and have since undertaken several national U.S. tours. In 2013 the band changed their name from AgesandAges to Ages and Ages. The rechristened band played their first European dates in the winter of 2014.

Career
Ages and Ages was formed in 2009, founded by Tim Perry (vocals, guitar), Rob Oberdorfer (bass, percussion, vocals), Graham Arthur Mackenzie (percussion, vocals), Kate O'Brien-Clarke (violin, percussion, vocals), Lisa Stringfield (vocals, percussion), Liz Robins (vocals, percussion) and Daniel Hunt (drums, percussion, vocals), alongside others from Portland's music community.

Alright You Restless arrived two years later and immediately proved a critical favorite. An ardent audience also surfaced, a committed cohort that included President Barack Obama who included the album's "No Nostalgia," a song "about transcending "the way things can get dark and you can feel claustrophobic, unsatisfied with the status quo" on his 2012 campaign playlist.

Ages and Ages performed at South by Southwest in Austin in March 2011. Their song "No Nostalgia" from their first album, Alright You Restless, was previewed on NPR. The album was recorded "almost entirely live" with seven voices singing into a single microphone, according to one account. It sounds like "a group of friends who drive around in a van singing songs wherever anyone will let them sing," according to critic Ryan White of The Oregonian.

The group draws "significant sonic influence from his religious upbringing" and that having seven members helps achieve a "congregation sound" even though the lyrics are basically secular thematically. Perry said the sound was achieved by "all the voices chiming in, that swell and spontaneous movement that grabs you," in an interview. In 2011, they released a video for the song "Navy Parade," which was directed by Alicia J. Rose Alright You Restless was produced by Kevin Robinson.

In 2014 the band released the album Divisionary which was produced by Tony Lash.

In August 2016, Ages and Ages released their third record Something to Ruin on Partisan Records.  The album was recorded at Isaac Brock's, Ice Cream Party Studios with the Modest Mouse front-man adding guitar to the track "So Hazy". The first single "They Want More" premiered on the June 7, 2016 episode of the NPR Podcast All Songs Considered.  Ages and Age's emphasis on featuring electronic and synthetic sounds makes Something to Ruin sonic departure from their previous albums. The band members cite a trip to Central America and the observation of their community being exploited by gentrification as the catalyst for the record.

Discography
 Alright You Restless, 2011, Knitting Factory
 Divisionary, 2014, Partisan
 Something to Ruin, 2016, Partisan
 Me You They We, 2019, Needle and Thread Records

References

External links
 Official website
 Ages and Ages on Partisan Records website
 NPR Tiny Desk Set via YouTube

Rock music groups from Oregon
American progressive rock groups
Indie pop groups from Oregon
Musical groups from Portland, Oregon
2009 establishments in Oregon
Musical groups established in 2009
Partisan Records artists
Knitting Factory Records artists